Destineer, Inc. was an American umbrella company covering a holding company, a video game publisher, and a video game developer that was based in Minnetonka, Minnesota. The company was founded by Peter Tamte, former executive vice-president of Bungie, in 2001. It developed some original titles and also ported games from Windows to Macs under a number of different brands, including MacSoft and Bold Games.

In May 2011, the company silently shut down, together with all of its divisions and subsidiaries.

Subsidiaries
MacSoft: On January 30, 2003, Infogrames Inc. announced it had sold MacSoft to Destineer, Inc.
Atomic Games, Inc.: On May 6, 2005, Destineer announced acquisition of Atomic Games, Inc.
Bold Games: A publishing label for Microsoft video games ported to Mac OS. The brand stopped publishing Mac OS games following MacSoft's acquisition.

Published games
 Age of Empires II
 Age of Empires III
 Candy Factory
 Cate West: The Vanishing Files
 Close Combat: First to Fight
 Fullmetal Alchemist Trading Card Game
 Fullmetal Alchemist: Dual Sympathy
 Giana Sisters DS
 Homie Rollerz
 Indianapolis 500 Legends
 Iron Chef America: Supreme Cuisine
 John Deere: American Farmer
 Links Championship Edition
 Little Red Riding Hood's Zombie BBQ
 Master of Orion III
 Neverwinter Nights
Rec Room Games
 Red Orchestra: Ostfront 41-45
 Starship Troopers
 Stoked
 Summer Sports: Paradise Island
 Sword of the Stars
 Taito Legends
 Taito Legends 2
 Taito Legends Power-Up
 Tropico
 Unreal Tournament 2003
 Unreal Tournament 2004
 We Wish You a Merry Christmas
 Wings Over Europe
 Wings Over Vietnam
 WordJong DS
 WWII Aces

References

External links

Defunct companies based in Minnesota
Video game companies established in 2001
Video game companies disestablished in 2011
Defunct video game companies of the United States
Video game development companies
Video game publishers